China National Highway 201 (G201) runs from Hegang, Heilongjiang Province to Lushunkou, Liaoning Province. It is 1,964 kilometres in length and runs southeast from Hegang towards the border with Russia before turning southwest, going via Mudanjiang, Heilongjiang Province and Dandong, Liaoning Province.

Route and distance

See also
 China National Highways

Transport in Dalian
Transport in Heilongjiang
Transport in Liaoning
Transport in Jilin
201